William Parker (died 24th September 1618) was an English captain and privateer, and also Mayor of Plymouth.

He was born near Plymouth and was a member of the lesser gentry  but he became one of the owners of the Merchants house & in 1601 became mayor of Plymouth before becoming a privateer in the services of Queen Elizabeth. In 1587 he sailed in consort with Sir Francis Drake during Drake's raid on raid on Cadiz, Spain.

In the 1590s Captain Parker sailed the West Indies taking several prizes. He also plundered Puerto Cortés in Honduras in 1594 and 1595. After 1596, as owner of his own vessel, he partnered with Sir Anthony Sherley, but this relationship ended when after a time no prizes were taken. Leaving Captain Sherley behind, Captain Parker attacked Campeche in Mexico. Captain Parker was wounded in the attack but survived and succeeded in capturing a frigate carrying silver which was en route to San Juan De Ulua.

Captain Parker next captured Portobello in February 1601. Portobello was a very important port being the departure point from which Peruvian treasure left for Spain. Captain Parker then sailed to Panama and plundered Saint Vincent in the Cape Verdes. He also captured and held for ransom the Cubagua pearl-boats and captured a Portuguese slave ship. His successes secured for him a prominent position in Plymouth, where he  was looked upon as a hero of sorts and elected mayor in 1601. He became a founding member of the Virginia Company in 1606.

Captain Parker was made Vice-Admiral and left on an expedition to the East Indies, but died on the voyage to Bantam on 24 Sept. 1618.

References 

1617 deaths
Mayors of Plymouth
English privateers
Year of birth unknown
Military personnel from Plymouth, Devon